José Perácio Berjun, also known as Perácio (2 November 1917 in Nova Lima – 10 March 1977 in Rio de Janeiro) was a Brazilian footballer who played as a striker.

Throughout his career (1932–1951) he played for Villa Nova, Botafogo, Flamengo and Canto do Rio and won three Minas Gerais state championships (1933, 1934 and 1935) and three Rio de Janeiro State Championship (1942, 1943 and 1944). At international level, he participated at the 1938 FIFA World Cup with the Brazil, helping his team to a third place finish, playing in four games and scoring three goals.

He was a volunteer in the Brazilian Expeditionary Force (FEB) during World War II.

He died at 59 years old.

Honours
Villa Nova
Minas Gerais state championships: 1933, 1934, 1935

Flamengo
Rio de Janeiro State Championship: 1942, 1943, 1944

References

External links

1917 births
1977 deaths
Brazilian footballers
Brazil international footballers
Association football forwards
1938 FIFA World Cup players
CR Flamengo footballers
Botafogo de Futebol e Regatas players
Villa Nova Atlético Clube players